Anab (Anav) is a city mentioned in the Hebrew Bible. It is mentioned in the Book of Joshua as one of the cities in the Judaean Mountains from which Joshua expelled the Anakim.

In the Hebrew Bible
Anab is mentioned in Joshua 11:21 --

"And Joshua came at that time, and cut off the Anakim from the hill-country, from Hebron, from Debir, from Anab, and from all the hill-country of Judah, and from all the hill-country of Israel; Joshua utterly destroyed them with their cities." -- Jewish Publication Society translation (1917).

Later, Joshua 15:50 lists Anab as one of a number of sites incorporated into the hilly parts of the territory of the Tribe of Judah.

In later sources 
Anab was mentioned in a Jewish document, written in Hebrew, self-dated to the "4th year after the destruction of the house of Israel", which scholars put at 140 CE, four years after the Roman suppression of the Bar Kokhba revolt.

Archeology 
Anav is identified with today's Khirbet Anab. It lies among the Hebron Hills, 
south-south-west of Hebron, in the West Bank.

A basilical-shaped church with Greek and Christian Palestinian Aramaic inscriptions was found at the site. The entire complex is 38 x 20 meters. Mosaic floors were discovered throughout the site; they suffered iconoclastic destruction during the early Islamic period (c. 8th century CE). The rooms of the complex were used for habitation during the Mamluk period in the 13th and 14th centuries.

References

Book of Joshua
Hebrew Bible cities
Anakim
Archaeological sites in the West Bank
Tribe of Judah